Araria is a neighbourhood in Araria, Bihar, India.

Araria may also refer to:
 Araria town
 Araria (community development block)
 Araria subdivision
 Araria district
 Araria (Vidhan Sabha constituency)
 Araria (Lok Sabha constituency)